The 1990 IIHF Asian Oceanic Junior U18 Championship was the seventh edition of the IIHF Asian Oceanic Junior U18 Championship. It took place between 10 and 17 February 1990 in Seoul, South Korea. The tournament was won by Japan, who claimed their fifth title by finishing first in the standings. China and South Korea finished second and third respectively.

Standings

Fixtures
Reference

References

External links
International Ice Hockey Federation

IIHF Asian Oceanic U18 Championships
Asian
International ice hockey competitions hosted by South Korea